Baisla is a Gujjar clan. Its variant spellings include Bainsle, Baisla, Besle, Bansla, Bainsla and Baisle.

Notable people with the surname, who may or may not be affiliated with the clan, include:

 Kirori Singh Bainsla, a retired Indian Army officer who led the Gurjar reservation agitation
 Rajkumar Baisla, Indian freestyle wrestler

References

Gurjar clans